2010 Regional League Division 2 Northern Region is the second season of the League competition since its establishment in 2009. It is in the third tier of the Thai football league system.

The league has been expanded from 11 clubs in 2009 to 16 clubs this season. The league winners and runners up will qualify for the 2010 Regional League Division 2 championship stage.

Changes from last season

Team changes

Promoted clubs

Chiangrai United were promoted to the 2010 Thai Division 1 League after coming 2nd in the 2009 Regional League Division 2 championship pool.

Relegated clubs

Nakhon Sawan were relegated from the 2009 Thai Division 1 League after finishing the season in 16th place.

Renamed clubs

Phrae renamed Phrae United
Chiangmai United renamed Chiangmai

Expansion clubs

Chiangrai, Lampang, Phayao and Uthai Thani joined the newly expanded league setup.

Stadium and locations

League table

Results

References

External links
 Football Association of Thailand

Regional League Northern Division seasons
Nor